Béatrice Kombe Gnapa (April 6, 1972 – February 21, 2007) was a dancer and choreographer from the Ivory Coast. She was considered a leading figure in modern experimental dance in Africa.

The daughter of a teacher of traditional dance, she was born in Touba. From an early age, she performed in traditional African dance groups. Gnapa formed the all-woman dance company TchéTché with dancer Jeety Lebri Bridgi in 1997. Her choreography was based on traditional dances which were given a contemporary interpretation. Her company TchéTché gave an award-winning performance at the Concours international de danse africaine in 1999. In the same year, the company performed at the Festival international de nouvelle danse in Montreal. Gnapa danced a duet with Nadja Bengré at the Rencontres chorégraphiques de l'Afrique et de l'océan indien in Paris in 2006. She had been a guest teacher in the theater and dance department at the University of Florida each year since 2002.

Her company appeared in the 2002 documentary African Dance : Sand, Drum and Shostakovich by Ken Glazebrook and Alla Kovgan. Gnapa appeared in Joan Frosch's 2006 documentary Movement (R)evolution Africa.

She died in Abidjan from kidney failure at the age of 34. Her company had just completed its second tour in the United States.

References 

1972 births
2007 deaths
Ivorian dancers
Ivorian female dancers
Ivorian choreographers
Women choreographers
Deaths from kidney failure